The Embassy of the Democratic People's Republic of Korea in Beijing is the diplomatic mission of North Korea to China. It is located in Chaoyang, Beijing. In addition to its embassy in Beijing, North Korea also has consulates in Dandong, Shenyang and Hong Kong. It is one of the largest embassies of North Korea and has dormitories, North Korean grocery shops, a currency exchange, an eyeglasses store, and a fruit and vegetable shop. The current ambassador is Li Ryong -num.

History 
The embassy was established on 6 September 1986.

In 2017, NK News reported that the embassy was building a hotel for visiting North Koreans. The hotel reportedly neared completion in early 2018.

See also 

 Embassy of China, Pyongyang
 List of diplomatic missions of North Korea
 List of diplomatic missions in China
 Foreign relations of North Korea

References 

North Korea
Beijing
China–North Korea relations